The UNESCO-Equatorial Guinea International Prize for Research in the Life Sciences  a scientific prize launched in 2012 by UNESCO to reward scientific research in the life sciences leading to improving the quality of human life.

Laureates

2012
Maged Al-Sherbiny, Egypt 
Felix Dapare Dakora, South Africa 
Rossana Arroyo, Mexico

2014
Hossein Baharvand (Iran)
André Bationo (Burkina-Faso)
Instituto de Medicina Tropical von Humboldt (IMT) at Universidad Peruana Cayetano Heredia

2015
Manoel Barral-Netto (Brazil) 
Balram Bhargava (India)
Amadou Alpha Sall (Senegal)

2017
Agricultural Research Organisation at the Volcani Centre Israel
Rui Luis Gonçalves dos Reis (Portugal)
Ivan Antonio Izquierdo (Brazil)

2019
Cato Laurencin (USA) 
Kevin McGuigan (Ireland)
Youyou Tu (China)

2022
Li Lanjuan (China)
Chad Mirkin (USA)
Christofer Toumazou (England)

See also

 List of biology awards

References

Biology awards
Awards established in 2012
UNESCO awards